Omar Mohamud Mohamed is a Somali politician and former warlord known as Omar Finnish (sometimes spelled Filish). He is the former Mayor of Mogadishu and Governor of Banaadir. He was appointed on 22 August 2019 by Somalia President Mohamed Abdullahi Mohamed. He stepped down on 7 September 2022 after the new president of Somalia, Hassan Sheikh Mohamud, reappointed Yusuf Hussein Jimaale, as the new mayor of Mogadishu and Governor of Banaadir.

United Somali Congress/Somali Salvation Alliance (USC/SSA) 

He is leader of a splinter movement of the United Somali Congress/Somali Salvation Alliance (USC/SSA), which had been initially loyal to Ali Mahdi Mohammed during the Somali Civil War. He was also once the loyal deputy of Musa Sudi Yalahow, but the two split and fought over control of Mogadishu.

ARPCT 

In early 2006, he was a member of the Alliance for the Restoration of Peace and Counter-Terrorism (ARPCT), a CIA-backed alliance which fought against the Islamic Courts Union (ICU). His forces were defeated by the ICU militia in the Second Battle of Mogadishu and he surrendered his military assets to the Islamist group after some negotiations.

Transitional Federal Government 

When the Transitional Federal Government (TFG) was organized in 2004, he was one of the 275 selected members of the Transitional Federal Parliament enumerated in the official list of August 29, 2004, listed as the Hon. Omar Mohamud Mohamed (Filish).  His term expired in 2009.

After the defeat of the ICU by the alliance of the Transitional Federal Government (TFG), the autonomous states of Puntland and Galmudug, various rebel leaders and, most importantly, the army of Ethiopia, he returned to Mogadishu and was present on January 12, 2007 at Villa Somalia where an agreement was reached between the Mogadishu warlords and the TFG to disarm the militias and to direct members to join the national army and police.

References 

Somalian faction leaders
Members of the Transitional Federal Parliament
Living people
United Somali Congress politicians
1965 births
Mayors of Mogadishu